Thalavoi (South) is a village in the Sendurai taluk of Ariyalur district, Tamil Nadu, India.

Demographics 

As per the 2001 census, Thalavoi (South) had a total population of 3396 with 1685 males and 1711 females.

References 

Villages in Ariyalur district